The women's team judo event at the 2015 European Games in Baku was held on 28 June at the Heydar Aliyev Arena.

Results

Repechage

References

External links
 
 
 
 

Wteam
2015
EU 2015
European Wteam